Sitter may refer to:

Roles
Babysitter, one who temporarily cares for a child
Trip sitter, one who remains sober while another person is under the influence of a drug
Companion (caregiving), one who is hired to work with a patient
Sitter, one who sits as the subject of a portrait painting

Films
 The Sitter, a 2011 film starring Jonah Hill
 The Sitter (1991 film), starring Kim Myers
 The Sitter (1977 film), a 1977 American short film
 While the Children Sleep or The Sitter, a 2007 film starring Mariana Klaveno

People with the surname
Carl L. Sitter (1922–2000), United States Marine Corps officer and Medal of Honor recipient
Inger Sitter (1929–2015), Norwegian artist

Other uses
Sitter (BEAM), a type of robot that does not move
Sitters, Germany, a municipality in Germany
, Switzerland

See also
Model (art)
De Sitter (disambiguation)
Babysitter (disambiguation)
House sitter (disambiguation)